Road warrior may refer to:

Arts, entertainment, and media
Road Warrior (Black Tide EP)
 "The Road Warrior" (The O.C.), an episode of The O.C.
 Mad Max 2 or The Road Warrior, a 1981 Australian film

Sports
 Greenville Road Warriors, an ice hockey team
 Road Warriors (Atlantic League), a baseball team 
 The Road Warriors, a professional wrestling team comprising:
 Road Warrior Animal, the ring name of the American wrestler Joseph Michael Laurinaitis
 Road Warrior Hawk, the ring name of Michael Hegstrand

Other uses
 Road warrior (computing), a mobile worker who is constantly on the road